Saadat Qoli-ye Olya (also Romanized as Sa‘ādat Qolī-ye ‘Olyā; also known as Sa‘ādat Qolī-ye Bālā and Sādāt Qolī Bālā) is a village in Quchan Atiq Rural District, in the Central District of Quchan County, Razavi Khorasan Province, Iran. At the 2006 census, its population was 104, in 22 families.

References 

Populated places in Quchan County